SpaceX CRS-15, also known as SpX-15, was a Commercial Resupply Service mission to the International Space Station launched 29 June 2018 aboard a Falcon 9 rocket. The mission was contracted by NASA and flown by SpaceX.

Launch

In early 2015, NASA awarded a contract extension to SpaceX for three additional CRS missions (CRS-13 to CRS-15). In June 2016, a NASA Inspector General report had this mission manifested for April 2018, but this was pushed back, first to 6 June, to 9 June, to 28 June and finally to 29 June 2018.

The mission launched on 29 June 2018 at 09:42 UTC aboard a Falcon 9 rocket from Cape Canaveral Air Force Station Launch Complex 40. The SpaceX Dragon spacecraft rendezvoused with the International Space Station on 2 July 2018. It was captured by the Canadarm2 at 10:54 UTC and was berthed to the Harmony node at 13:50 UTC.

It is reported that the Dragon spacecraft may have experienced some parachute anomaly during its flight to the ISS, but it did not prevent the capsule from successful splashdown.

Payload
NASA contracted for the CRS-15 mission from SpaceX and therefore determined the primary payload, date/time of launch, and orbital parameters for the Dragon space capsule. The external payloads manifested for this flight were ECOSTRESS and a Latching End Effector for Canadarm2. CubeSats included on this flight were three Biarri-Squad satellites built by Boeing for a multinational partnership led by the U.S. National Reconnaissance Office, and three satellites making up the Japanese-sponsored Birds-2 program: BHUTAN-1 from Bhutan, Maya-1 from the Philippines, and UiTMSAT-1 from Malaysia. Furthermore, it contained an interactive artwork by artist Nahum entitled The Contour of Presence, a collaboration with the International Space University, Space Application Services and the European Space Agency.

The following is a breakdown of cargo bound for the ISS:
 Science investigations: 
 Crew supplies: 
 Vehicle hardware: 
 Spacewalk equipment: 
 Computer resources: 
 Russian hardware: 
 External payloads: 
 ECOSTRESS: 
 Latching End Effector:

See also
Uncrewed spaceflights to the International Space Station
List of Falcon 9 and Falcon Heavy launches
2018 in spaceflight
Artworks launched into space
Birds-2

References

External links
 
 Dragon website at SpaceX.com
 Commercial Resupply Services at NASA.gov

SpaceX Dragon
Spacecraft launched in 2018
Spacecraft which reentered in 2018
SpaceX payloads contracted by NASA
Supply vehicles for the International Space Station